Shaun O'Brien (born 31 May 1969) is an Australian cyclist. He won the silver medal in the Men's team pursuit at the 1992 Summer Olympics.

References 

1969 births
Living people
Cyclists at the 1992 Summer Olympics
Olympic cyclists of Australia
Olympic silver medalists for Australia
Australian male cyclists
Olympic medalists in cycling
Medalists at the 1992 Summer Olympics
Commonwealth Games medallists in cycling
Commonwealth Games silver medallists for Australia
Australian track cyclists
Cyclists at the 1990 Commonwealth Games
20th-century Australian people
21st-century Australian people
Medallists at the 1990 Commonwealth Games